Bothrolysin (Bothrops metalloendopeptidase J, J protease) is an enzyme. This enzyme catalyses the following chemical reaction

 Cleavage of Gln4-His, Ser9-His and Ala14-Leu of insulin B chain and Pro-Phe of angiotensin I

This endopeptidase is present in the venom of the jararaca snake (Bothrops jararaca).

References

External links 
 

EC 3.4.24